Law enforcement in China consists of an extensive public security system and a variety of enforcement procedures used to maintain order in the country. Along with the courts and procuratorates, the country's judicial and public security agencies include the Ministry of Public Security (MPS) and the Ministry of State Security (MSS), with their descending hierarchy of departments, bureaus (局, "Jú"), subbureaus (副局, "Fù jú"), and stations (所, "Suǒ").

Hong Kong and Macau have separate law enforcement agencies, different legal systems and are classified as separate jurisdictions under the one country two systems framework. However, Hong Kong Police Force (HKPF) and Public Security Police Force of Macau often cooperate with the mainland MPS on cases involving cross border crime.

Overview 
The national security system is made up of the Ministry of Public Security (MPS) and the Ministry of State Security (MSS), the People's Armed Police (PAP), the People's Liberation Army (PLA), and the state judicial, procuratorial, and penal systems. 

Ministry of Public Security (MPS) oversees all domestic police activity in China. The ministry is responsible for police operations and detention centers and has dedicated departments for internal political, economic, and communications security. Its lowest organizational units are public security stations, which maintain a close day-to-day contact with the public. The People's Armed Police Force, with its 1.5 million personnel, is organized into 45 divisions. These include security police, border defense personnel, guards for government buildings and embassies, and police communications specialists.

Ministry of State Security (MSS) was established in 1983 to ensure "the security of the state through effective measures against enemy agents, spies, and counterrevolutionary activities designed to sabotage or overthrow China's socialist system." The ministry is guided by a series of laws enacted in 1993, 1994, and 1997 that replaced the "counterrevolutionary" crime statutes. The ministry's operations include intelligence collection, both domestic and foreign. Authorities have used arrests on charges of revealing state secrets, subversion, and common crimes to suppress political dissent and social advocacy.

The Ministry of Justice maintains oversees the operation of prisons.

The Security Bureau is the local security department for Hong Kong. The paramilitary style Hong Kong Police Force was established in 1844 during the British occupation of Hong Kong and has 27,375 uniformed personnel and 4,885 civilian staff. Hong Kong Correctional Service was established in 1879 and has 6,659 uniformed personnel and civilian staff. Both services report to the Security Bureau.

Secretariat for Security (Macau) is the local security department in Macau. Macau Security Force (established in 1999 by the merger of the Judiciary Police Unitary Police Service, Macau Prisons) is a force of 3,700 personnel and reports to the local Security department.

Judicial and legal system 

In 2004 the National People's Congress (NPC) amended the constitution so that for the first time the protection of the individual was incorporated as a constitutional requirement. Specifically, Articles 37 and 38 recognize the "freedom of the person" and the "personal dignity of citizens" as "inviolable." In practice, these amendments are generally widely respected.

The 1997 Criminal Procedure Law allows the police to detain a person for up to 37 days before release or formal arrest, more vigorous court reviews have led to the release of thousands of unlawfully detained individuals. The law stipulates that the authorities must notify a detainee's family or work unit of the detention within 24 hours.

Police sometimes hold individuals without granting access to family members or lawyers, and their trials are sometimes conducted in secret. Detained criminal suspects, defendants, their legal representatives, and close relatives are entitled to apply for bail, but, in practice, few suspects are released pending trial. There used to be a reeducation-through-labor system that allows nonjudicial panels of police and local civil authorities to sentence individuals to up to three years in prison-like facilities, which practice was abolished in 2013.

Citizens have a constitutional guarantee of the right to use their own spoken and written language in court proceedings. Courts and procuratorates are advised by the constitution that they "should provide translations for any party to the court proceedings who is not familiar with the spoken or written languages in common use in the locality." The constitution provides for an independent judiciary, but the courts are subjected to party and government policy guidance that influences the outcome of verdicts and sentences. Conviction rates in criminal cases in the early 2000s were approximately 90 percent, and trials generally were little more than sentencing hearings. Although most suspects in criminal cases are legally guaranteed the right to counsel, they often meet their appointed attorney only once before the hearing; at best, a defense attorney can obtain a reduction of the sentence. In many politically sensitive trials, rarely lasting more than several hours, the courts hand down guilty verdicts immediately following proceedings, and death sentences are often implemented within days of the rejection of an appeal.

The legal system in Hong Kong is based in English Common law and remains unchanged for at least 50 years from 1997. The legal system in Macau is based in Portuguese legal system, as well as some aspects of German law, Chinese law, Italian law, and some English common law. Like Hong Kong, the Macau's legal structure will remain as is for at least 50 years from 1999. Both SARs have separate judicial systems, but the NPC is still the highest legal organ.

Key organizations

Ministry of Public Security (MPS) 
The Ministry of Public Security is the principal police authority. The ministry has functional departments for areas such as internal security, intelligence, counter-terrorism, police operations, prisons, and political, economic, and communications security. Subordinate to the ministry are provincial-level public security departments; public security bureaus (PSB's) and sub-bureaus at the county level (the bureaus located in the prefectures and large cities, the sub-bureaus in counties and municipal districts); and public security stations at the township level.

While public security considerations has a strong influence at all levels of administration, the police appear to wield progressively greater influence at the lower levels of government.

The organization of local public security stations can be inferred from the tasks with which the police are charged. Generally, each station has sections for population control, pre-trial investigations, welfare, traffic control, a detention center, and other activities.

The public security station (派出所） - the police element in closest contact with the people - is supervised by the public security sub-bureau as well as by local governments and procuratorates. The procuratorate assumes direct responsibility for handling any case it chooses, and it supervises investigations in those cases it allows the public security station to conduct. A great deal of coordination occurs among the public security organs, the procuratorates, and the courts, so that a trial is unlikely to produce a surprise outcome.

The public security station generally has considerably broader responsibilities than a police station in the other countries, involving itself in every aspect of the district people's lives. In a rural area it has a chief, a deputy chief, a small administrative staff, and a small police force. In an urban area it has a greater number of administrative staff members and seven to eighteen patrolmen. Its criminal law activities includes investigation, apprehension, interrogation, and temporary detention. The station's household section maintains a registry of all persons living in the area. Births, deaths, marriages, and divorces are recorded and confirmed through household checks. The station regulates all hotels and requires visitors who remain beyond a certain number of days to register. It also regulates the possession, transportation, and use of all explosives, guns, ammunition, and poisons.

Another important police function is controlling change of residence. Without such controls, larger numbers of rural residents undoubtedly would move to the overcrowded cities in search of better living standards, work, or education (see Urbanization in China). In April 1984 the State Council issued the "Tentative Regulations Governing People's Republic of China Resident Identity". The regulations, to be implemented over a period of years, required all residents over sixteen years of age, except active-duty members of the PLA and the People's Armed Police and inmates serving sentences, to be issued resident identity cards by the Ministry of Public Security. The picture cards indicated the name, sex, nationality, date of birth, and address of the bearer.

Special police operations involve the employment of agents and informants. Informants are used in surveillance of suspected criminals.

The criminal laws in force after January 1, 1980, restricted police powers regarding arrests, investigations, and searches. A public security official or a citizen could apprehend a suspect under emergency conditions, but a court or procuratorate was required to approve the arrest. The accused had to be questioned within twenty-four hours and his or her family notified of the detention "except in circumstances where notification would hinder the investigation or there was no way to notify them." Any premeditated arrest required a court or procuratorate warrant. The time that an accused could be held pending investigation was limited to three to seven days, and incarceration without due process is illegal.

Two officials were needed to conduct a criminal investigation. They were required to show identification and to inform the accused of the crime allegedly committed before he or she was questioned. The suspect could refuse to answer only those questions irrelevant to the case.

The 1980 laws also provided that in conjunction with an arrest the police could conduct an emergency search; otherwise, a warrant was required. They had the right to search the person, property, and residence of an accused and the person of any injured party. They could intercept mail belonging to the accused and order an autopsy whenever cause of death was unclear.

In July 1980 the government approved new regulations governing police use of weapons and force. Police personnel could use their batons only in self-defense or when necessary to subdue or prevent the escape of violent criminals or rioters. Lethal weapons, such as pistols, could be used if necessary to stop violent riots, to lessen the overall loss of life, or to subdue surrounded but still resisting criminals. The regulations also governed use of sirens, police lights, and whistles. The rules were changed in 1996, with the type of crimes made more specific.

The relationship between the police officers assigned to neighbourhood patrols and the people is close. Police officers live in a neighbourhood on a long-term assignment and are expected to know all the residents personally. Their task is not only to prevent and punish crime but to promote desirable behaviour by counselling and acting as role models. This positive side of the police officer's duties was a constant responsibility, and the bond between the public security units and the people are strengthened annually by means of "cherish-the-people" months, during which the police officer makes a special effort to be of help, especially to the aged and the infirm.

People's Armed Police (PAP) 

The People's Armed Police (PAP) is the Gendarmerie paramilitary police force originally under the joint supervision of the MPS and Central Military Commission (CMC). However, after a series of high-profile corruption scandals involving their misuse by Bo Xilai, then party secretary of Chongqing, in the Wang Lijun incident, it was decided under the 2015 military reforms to place all People's Armed Police personnel under the direct and exclusive control of the CMC. After a trial period in selected jurisdictions, the PAP was officially established at the national level in 1983. In line with the general policy of reducing the size of the armed forces and transferring responsibilities to the civilian sector, the newly established force was formed from internal security units reassigned from the PLA to the Ministry of Public Security and from border defense (customs) and fire-fighting units. In 1985 the PAP consisted of approximately 600,000 volunteers and conscripts. With a headquarters at the national level and division-level provincial units, regimental-level detachments, and battalion-level brigades, it retained its military organization. Current strength of PAP is estimated at 1.5 million.

PAP units are responsible for guarding party and state organizations and foreign embassies and consulates, as well as for responding to emergencies and maintaining law and order. Border defense units performed standard customs duties, such as inspecting vehicles and ships entering and leaving the country, and maintained surveillance against smugglers and drug traffickers. PAP firefighting units were responsible for fire-prevention education as well as for fighting fires. PAP units at every level worked in close cooperation with the armed forces and other public security organizations.

As of July 1, 2018, the China Coast Guard was transferred from civilian control of the State Council and the State Oceanic Administration, to the People's Armed Police, ultimately placing it under the command of the Central Military Commission.

In June 2018, the China Coast Guard was granted maritime rights and law enforcement akin civilian law enforcement agencies in order to carry out contrast of illegal activities, keep peace and order, as well as safeguarding security at sea, when performing duties related to the use of marine resources, protection of marine environment, regulation of fishery, and anti-smuggling.

Urban Administration and Law Enforcement Bureaus 
Cities in China often have uniformed, but unarmed, urban management officers often referred to as "Chengguan" (城管; lit: "City Management Officers") under the control of the municipal governments of each province. Chengguan are hired and employed by the Urban Administrative and Law Enforcement Bureaus of local governments. They are usual civil servants acting as parapolice and do have formal police or law enforcement powers. The agency is in charge with enforcement of urban management of the city. This includes enforcing local bylaws on city appearance, environmental, sanitation, work safety, pollution control and health. Additionally, their duties also involve enforcement of planning, greening, industry and commerce regulations, environment protection, municipal affairs and water in large cities.

Since the establishment of the Chengguan in 2001/2002, there have been numerous cases of Chengguan in cities across China using excessive violence and abuse of power. Numerous incidents have occurred over the years  involving Chengguan seriously wounding innocents and even beating people to death in public. Chengguan are known to have a notorious reputation due to corruption and nepotism in their hiring, training and recruitment and is the source of much resentment among local Chinese. In recent years efforts have been made to ameliorate the tense relation between the Chengguan and the general public, with mixed results.

Police vehicles 
Police cars in the mainland are white with a dark blue swoosh painted on the side such as BYD e6. China does not have a uniform fleet buying program so local departments typically buy from a variety of local dealerships. Volkswagen Santanas and Volkswagen Passats are the most common but other makes and models are present as well.

Hong Kong Police vehicles have been influenced by British and Chinese schemes and still today retain them. Police in Macau use generic European designs patterns.

Historical background 
However much the public security system may have been influenced by communist ideology and practice, it remained rooted directly in the traditional Chinese concept of governmental control through imposed collective responsibility. Even in the pre-imperial era, a system was proposed to organize the people into "groups of families which would be mutually responsible for each other's good behavior and share each other's punishments." The Qin (221-207 BCE) and Han (206 BCE-CE 220) dynasties made use of the concept, and the Song dynasty (960-1279) institutionalized it on a nationwide basis in the bao jia (tithing) system. It entailed the organization of family households into groups of ten, each unit being organized successively into a larger unit up to the county level of administration. Each family sent a representative to the monthly meeting of its unit, and each unit elected a leader to represent it at the next higher level. Since the head of each unit was responsible to the next higher level for the conduct of all members of his unit, the system served as an extension of the central government. Eventually, each group of families also was required to furnish men to serve in the militia. Bao jia, which alternately flourished or languished under later rulers and usually existed more in theory than in practice, was reinstituted during the Qing dynasty (1644–1911).

During the Qing period, the people's aversion to legalistic procedures and the rulers' preferences for socially and collectively imposed sanctions continued. Technically, the magistrate was to hear even minor criminal cases; but local elders and village leaders were allowed to handle most disputes, freeing the magistrate for more important work and saving the government expense. The people preferred to handle matters in this way, outside the intimidating court system.

Other practices for maintaining public order in China during the imperial era included the formation of mutual aid groups of farm households, which over time came to assume police functions. In a manner similar to twentieth-century means of ideological control, the Qing bureaucracy organized mass lectures that stressed the Confucian principle of obedience. Still another traditional form of policing was the appointment of censors to investigate corruption and misconduct up to the highest levels of government. Doing that job too well cost many censors their lives.

In 1932 Chiang Kai-shek's Kuomintang (KMT) government reinstituted the bao jia system. In the KMT's revised bao jia system, in addition to the chief, there were two officers of importance within each 100-family unit. The population officer maintained the records and reported all births, deaths, marriages, moves, and unlawful activities to the district office. The bao jia troop commander headed a self-defense unit and was responsible for maintaining law and order. In rural China, however, the local village was generally a self-contained world, and the peasants remained aloof from distant and higher-ranking centers of authority.

The Japanese were introduced to the bao jia system on Taiwan when they assumed control of the island after the Sino-Japanese War (1894–95), and they found the system highly suitable for administering occupied areas. They instituted modified versions of it in north China after 1937. The Japanese imposed severe restrictions on the population, and the system aided in taking the census, restricting movement, and conducting spot checks. Each household had to affix a wooden tablet on the front door with the names of all inhabitants inscribed. Anyone missing or not on the list during an inspection by Japanese troops was assumed to be an insurgent. Since there were not as many Japanese troops in south China as in the north, the local leaders assisted the Japanese in administering the areas. They also disseminated propaganda at neighborhood meetings and established self-defense and youth corps.

The Communists were themselves products of Chinese society, and when they came to power in 1949 they liberally borrowed from these historical examples. They extensively organized the population and maintained the principles of mutual surveillance and mutual responsibility. They also retained the concept of self-defense forces. Communist control, however, exceeded that of bao jia or any other traditional system and extended into virtually every household. Under communist rule, the family was not considered an effective control mechanism. To achieve near-total control, a large number of administrative agencies and social organizations were established or adapted. Police forces resembling the Soviet police in organization, power, and activities were organized with the aid of Soviet advisers.

From 1949 to 1953, the newly established government of the People's Republic made use of the PLA, militia units made up of demobilized soldiers and other civilians, the police, and loyal citizens to put down resistance and establish order. Remnants of the Republic of China Armed Forces remained in pockets on the mainland, and communist efforts to enforce tax laws and agricultural rules provoked disturbances and riots. Extending responsibility for public order to include the police, military, and citizenry proved to be a highly effective arrangement, and the concept was written into the Common Program that preceded the 1954 state constitution.

The PLA and the militia continued to share responsibility for internal security and public order under the 1954 state constitution. The PLA's involvement in internal affairs was most extensive during the more turbulent period of the Cultural Revolution (1966–76). Mao Zedong, perceiving that the public security cadres were protecting precisely the party leaders he wished to purge, directed youthful Red Guards to crush the police, courts, and procuratorates as well. The minister of public security, Luo Ruiqing (who concurrently served as the chief of Joint staff), was purged, soon followed by heads of the courts and procuratorates.

Initially, the military tried to remain uninvolved. But on Mao's orders, the PLA, which had once been told to support (actually to acquiesce to) the Red Guards, moved in to quell the chaos that Mao had inspired. The PLA gradually took over public security functions by establishing military control committees to replace the government bureaucracy. Revolutionary committees were set up as provincial-level and local administrative organs, usually with a PLA cadre in charge, and order gradually returned. By the summer of 1968 the Red Guards were being disbanded, and mass trials were used to punish and intimidate rioters.

With nineteen of China's twenty-nine provincial-level people's revolutionary committees headed by PLA commanders, the military again was in charge of administration and security throughout the country, but it badly needed help from experienced police officers. A policy of leniency toward most former officials evolved, and some public security cadres returned to work. The PLA also recruited inexperienced people to form auxiliary police units. These units were mass organizations with a variety of names reflecting their factional orientation. Perhaps the best known unit was the "Attack with Reason, Defend with Force Corps" named for the militant slogan of Mao's wife, Jiang Qing. Public security forces were composed largely of non-professionals and lacked the disciplined informant networks and personnel dossiers previously used to maintain order.

Beginning in 1968, the authorities called upon the PLA to help remove millions of urban dwellers from the overcrowded cities and relocate them to the countryside and to transport cashiered officials to special cadre schools for indoctrination and labor. The migration to the country mostly involved students and other youths for whom there were not enough jobs or places in the school system within the cities. Yet despite the discontent these campaigns caused, reported crime declined after 1970. Increased concern over the threat from the Soviet Union in the wake of armed clashes on the Sino-Soviet border in 1969 forced the PLA gradually to return to barracks, and control of the country reverted to the civilian leadership.

The Beijing-based Central Security Regiment, also known as the 8341 Unit, was an important PLA law enforcement element. It was responsible over the years for the personal security of Mao Zedong and other party and state leaders. More than a bodyguard force, it also operated a nationwide intelligence network to uncover plots against Mao or any incipient threat to the leadership. The unit reportedly was deeply involved in undercover activities, discovering electronic listening devices in Mao's office and performing surveillance of his rivals. The 8341 Unit participated in the late 1976 arrest of the Gang of Four, but it reportedly was deactivated soon after that event.

The militia also participated in maintaining public order in the 1970s. Their involvement was especially evident in the 1973-76 period. In 1973 the Gang of Four, concerned over the transformation of the PLA into a more professional, less political, military force, took control of the urban militia from the PLA and placed it under local party committees loyal to them. For the next three years, the urban militia was used extensively to enforce radical political and social policies. It was the urban militia, along with the public security forces, that broke up the demonstrations in Tiananmen Square honoring the memory of Zhou Enlai in April 1976 — the event that served as the pretext for the second purge of Deng Xiaoping. At the time, in rural areas the militia was more under the control of the PLA.

Public security officials also made extensive use of the authority granted them to impose administrative sanctions by two sets of documents. These were the 1957 Regulations on Reeducation Through Labor, which were reissued in 1979 with amendments, and the 1957 Regulations Governing Offenses Against Public Order, which were rescinded and replaced in 1986 by regulations of the same name. Offenders under the Regulations on Reeducation Through Labor might include "vagabonds, people who have no proper occupation, and people who repeatedly breach public order." The police could apprehend such individuals and sentence them to reeducation through labor with the approval of local labor-training administration committees. The 1957 regulations placed no limit on the length of sentences, but beginning in the early 1960s three or four years was the norm. The 1979 amended regulations, however, limited the length of reeducation through labor to three years with possible extension for extraordinary cases. The Regulations Governing Offenses Against Public Order empowered the police to admonish, fine, or detain people for up to fifteen days. Goods illegally in the possession of an offender were to be confiscated, and payment was imposed for damages or hospital fees in the event injury had been caused.

History of grass-roots organizations
Neighborhood committees in the 1980s continued to be heavily involved in law enforcement and mediation of disputes at the local level. Among the enforcement procedures these committees used to influence both thought and behavior were criticism and collective responsibility.

Before the reform era, aspects of Chinese society also contributed to shaping the contemporary structure for maintaining public order. During the beginning of the 1980s economic reforms, urban and rural dwellers rarely changed their residences. Amid the sprawling cities, neighborhoods remained closeknit communities. For the 80 percent of the population that lived in the countryside, home and place of work were the same. With little physical mobility, most villagers stayed put for generations and knew each other intimately. In such close-knit environments, where everyone was likely to know everyone else and noticed most of what happened, mutual surveillance and peer pressure was extremely effective.

The structure of the public security system remained extensive in the 1980s, and the authority of its forces exceeded that of most police forces in the West. Nevertheless, public security agencies required and received the assistance of a wide-ranging network of grass-roots organizations to mobilize residents' responses to the government's call for observance of laws, lead the people in maintaining social order and public security, and settle disputes among residents.

In urban areas an average of 11 patrolmen were responsible for controlling an area containing 15,000 or more residents. A patrolman could not know all the people and their particular problems, and therefore needed and enlisted help. The local people's governments and congresses shared responsibility for public order but had no special personnel for the task. The armed forces were available, but they had other primary concerns and would be called out only in the most extreme circumstances.

To provide security beyond what could be provided by the police and to extend government control, a system of neighborhood or street committees had been established on a nationwide basis in 1954. The committees were charged with the responsibility of assisting the government in maintaining order. They usually controlled from 10,000 to 20,000 people and consisted of 3 to 7 full-time officials. In the late 1970s, the size and functions of neighborhood committees were expanded. The neighborhood committees were specifically responsible for maintaining public order and were accountable to the local people's congress.

Residents' committees and residents' "small groups," also established in 1954, were subordinate to neighborhood committees. These were the genuine grass-roots organizations, staffed by unpaid local residents elected by their neighbors. They directly involved the people in controlling their neighborhoods, and they reduced the demands on formal state institutions by maintaining surveillance for the public security forces and mediating most civil disputes and minor criminal cases for the judiciary. A residents' committee supervised from 100 to 600 families with a staff of 7 to 17 members, one from each subordinate residents' small group. A residents' small group controlled fifteen to forty households. The public security organization in the countryside was also pervasive. From the 1950s to the early 1980s, it was structured along military lines. The people's commune was the lowest level of government organization, with its administrative committee on a legal par with the local people's government in the urban areas. People's communes were subdivided into production brigades and production teams. Each team elected a people's public security committee, which sent a representative to the committee at the brigade level. Physical control was mostly the responsibility of the militia units organized at the team, brigade, and commune levels. In the winter of 1982-83 communes were replaced by township governments, and grass-roots committees were patterned after urban committees. These rural grass-roots committees were given legal status by the Draft Organic Regulations for Villagers' Committees approved by the National People's Congress in April 1987.

Residents' committees and small groups were staffed originally by housewives and retired persons but involved others as their functions expanded. Their pervasive presence made them a primary means for disseminating propaganda, and their grass-roots nature allowed for effective use of peer pressure in mediating disputes and controlling troublemakers. Perhaps 4 or 5 percent of the adult population exercised some authority in what Western experts have described as "participatory democracy in an extended form." The functional subunits, the residents' committees and residents' small groups, were particularly important in controlling the people.

People's mediation committees, guided and supervised jointly by the basic people's court and the public security station, performed an important function within the residents' committees. They settled minor disputes and disagreements using conciliation and peer pressure. Mediation committees were established originally in communist areas during the Chinese Civil War (1945–49) as a natural outgrowth of traditional preferences for local mediation of disputes. Upon taking over the major cities of China in 1949, the Communists were confronted with a tremendous backlog of judicial cases. Mediation committees provided a means of resolving disputes while actively propagandizing and involving the people in the new government. Beginning in 1954 mediation committees were set up in neighborhoods, stores, schools, enterprises, factories, and workshops in the cities and in the production brigades and teams in the countryside.

In the 1980s the five- to eleven-member people's mediation committees were elected by popular vote to two-year terms with the option of being reelected. Members served without pay and could be removed at any time by the electors for dereliction of duty. They were responsible for settling disputes, strengthening popular unity, promoting production and order, and conducting propaganda activities. Parties in dispute came voluntarily to the mediation committee; people seemed to feel they should try mediation before proceeding to a lawsuit. Mediators' duties ranged from acting as go-betweens for parties who refused to talk to one another to defining issues, deciding questions of fact, and issuing tentative or advisory decisions. Mediation committees also exerted strong political, economic, social, and moral pressures upon one or both parties to gain "voluntary" compliance with the decisions. In addition to mediation committees, other officials, police officers, party members, and work supervisors were expected to serve as mediators. Members of the residents' committees and small groups who were not members of the mediation committees were also involved in the mediation process.

Illegal drug trafficking

See also 

 Crime in China
 Court system of the People's Republic of China
 Law of the People's Republic of China
 Ministry of Public Security of the People's Republic of China
 Public Security Bureau (PSB)
 People's Armed Police
 Ministry of State Security of the People's Republic of China
 Ministry of Justice of the People's Republic of China
 Terrorism in the People's Republic of China
 Custody and repatriation 1982 -2003
 Secretariat for Security (Macau)
 Macau Security Force
 Public Security Police Force of Macau
 Law enforcement in Hong Kong
 Security Bureau (Hong Kong)
 Hong Kong Police Force
 Judiciary of Hong Kong
 Department of Justice (Hong Kong)
 Judiciary of Macau
 Legal system of Macau
 Secretary for Justice (Macau)

References

Citations

Sources 

 
 Kam C. Wong, Chinese Policing: History and Reform (N.Y.: Peter Lang, 2009)
 Kam C. Wong, Police Reform in China (Taylor and Francis, 2011) 
 Kam C. Wong, Cyberspace Governance in China (Nova Science Publisher, 2011)